Chattambi Swamikal (25 August 1853 – 5 May 1924) was a Hindu sage and social reformer raised from Nair community. His thoughts and work influenced the launching of many social, religious, literary and political organisations and movements in Kerala and for the first time gave voice to those who were marginalised.

Chattambi Swamikal denounced the orthodox interpretation of Hindu texts citing sources from the Vedas. Swamikal along with his contemporary or disciple, Narayana Guru, strived to reform the heavily ritualistic and caste-ridden Hindu society of the late 19th century Kerala. Swamikal also worked for the emancipation of women and encouraged them to come to the forefront of society. Swamikal promoted vegetarianism and professed non-violence (Ahimsa). Swamikal believed that the different religions are different paths leading to the same place. Chattambi Swamikal throughout his intellectually and spiritually enriched life maintained many friends from different regions of Kerala. He authored several books on spirituality, history, and language staying with these friends.

Early life

Chattambi Swamikal was born on 25 August 1853 at Kollur in southern Travancore. His father was Thamarassery Vasudeva Sharma, a Nambudiri Brahmin from Mavelikkara, and his mother was Nangamma Pillai, a Nair from Kannammoola. He was called by the pet name of Kunjan Pillai – meaning "small male baby" – by all. As his parents were not able to provide him formal education, he learned letters and words from children of his neighbourhood who attended schools. Also he learned Sanskrit by overhearing the classes at a Brahmin house nearby. Knowing his thirst for learning an uncle took him to the traditional school conducted by Pettayil Raman Pillai Asan, a renowned scholar and writer who taught him without any fee. It was there that he earned the name Chattampi on account of his assignment as the monitor of the class.

Jñānaprajāgaram

In the 1870s Raman Pillai started a scholarly group named 'Jñānaprajāgaram' with experts on different subjects with progressive attitude. It served as a meeting place for many scholars of that time and facilitated Kunjan to acquaint himself with many great men. He also could learn Tamil from Swaminatha Desikar and philosophy from Professor Manonmaniyam Sundaram Pillai during his participation in 'Jnanaprajagaram'. Kunjan Pillai was introduced into the science of yoga by the Thycaud Ayyavu Swamikal a scholar and yogi who used to give lectures at 'Jnanaprajagaram'. While so a wandering sadhu who came to his village temple initiated him into spiritual world by giving the Balasubramanya Mantra. Mastering this mantra gave him a new vigour and zeal and he assumed the name Shanmukhadasa due to his deep devotion of Subramanya.

Ordinary days
As the burden of supporting the family fell on him, Kunjan Pillai took to many manual works. For many days he served as a labourer carrying building materials for the construction of Government Secretariat building in Trivandrum. For some time he worked as a document writer and also as an advocate's clerk. He stood first in a test for clerical posts in Government Secretariat Trivandrum conducted by Sir T Madhava Rao the then Divan of Travancore State. But he left the service after a short while as it curtailed his freedom and prevented his wanderings for spiritual exploitations and research.

Meets Subba Jatapadikal

In one of the Philosophical Conferences organised annually by the Travancore Kings at the Palace complex adjacent to Sree Padmanabha Swami Temple Kunjan Pillai met Subba Jatapadikal from Kalladaikurichin in Southern Tamil Nadu; a renowned teacher well versed in Tarka, Vyakarana, Mimasa, and Vedanta. Both were impressed by the other and Kunjan's wish to learn at Kalladaikurichin under him was granted.

He spent many years learning under Subba Jatapadikal. There he acquired deep and extensive mastery of all sastras in Tamil and Sanskrit. He also learned Siddha medicine, music, and martial arts. During this period he was greatly influenced by the works of Kodakanallur Sundara Swamikal a great Advaitin. He later translated his work Nijananda Vilasam containing the cream of Vedanta into simple Malayalam to guide spiritual aspirants.

Study of other religions
After completing his studies under Subba Jatapadikal he spent long periods of learning under a Christian priest. In a secluded church in Southern Tamil Nadu assisting the priest he learned Christian Religion and philosophy. Later he lived with an old Muslim well versed in Qur'an and Sufi mysticism who taught him the main tenet of Islam. Kunjan acquired proficiency reading Qur'an in the traditional way. Leaving him he wandered for months with many avadhutas in Southern Tamil Nadu and also traveled all over India. These days revealed to him that the basic concepts of all religions are the same.

Self-realisation
At the end of his wanderings and quest Kunjan Pillai was led to self-realisation by an avadhuta whom he met at a wayside in Vadaveeswaram a village in Tamil Nadu with whom he lived for many months in the forests without any contact with the outside world. It is believed that this avadhuta belonged to the line of immortal masters of Southern India; the Siddhas who knew the scientific art for realising God. He returned to Kerala as a great scholar and saint.

Major disciples
Swamikal's prominent disciples are Narayana Guru, Neelakanta Theerthapada and Theerthapada Parmahamsa. In 1882, at the Aniyoor Temple near Vamanapuram, Swamikal met Nanu Asan, later known as Narayana Guru. Asan was three years younger than Swamikal and in search of spiritual guidance. By then Swamikal was well-versed in yoga and spiritual matters and their meeting proved to be the start of a profound and cherished companionship, although the two were of different temperaments In those days Nanu Asan was a soft-spoken introvert and Swamikal was an outspoken extrovert. They lived and travelled for many months together. Swami introduced Asan to all arts and sciences he had mastered and also gave him the Balasubrahmanya mantra. These were the formative years of Asan, who later became a social reformer. Later Swamikal took Asan to his guru, Ayyavu Swamikal. After completing Asan's studies under Ayyavu Swamikal the men left him and wandered together in southern Tamil Nadu where they met many scholars. Narayana Guru practised austere Jnana and Yoga under Swamikal during this period. It was with Chattampi Swamikal that Asan made his first trip to Maruthuvamalai, and later to Aruvippuram, which was chosen as his abode for meditation and spiritual activities and which was where he was led to self-realisation. It was after this that he was known as Narayana Guru. Swamikal did not stay there for long, although the two maintained a lifelong contact, respect and regard for each other. The poem Narayana Guru composed when he learned that Swami's samadhi was the only offering he gave to any person and it reveals how he considered Swamikal to be a realised soul. It is the most authoritative critical assessment on Swamikal ever done.

In 1893 Swamikal met his second disciple, Theerthapada, a Sanskrit scholar and an expert in treating snakebites. Inspired by Swamikal, he prepared many works interpreting Advaita for the common man. He also reformed the social and religious rituals and rules and prepared manuals for them. He died in 1921 and Swami installed a Sivalinga above his Samadhi Peeta, which is the only temple, consecrated by him.

In 1898, Theerthapada Paramahamsa became Swami's disciple. He, too, worked for the removal of caste-related injustices in Kerala society. He established many ashrams and also Theerthapada System for the line of sanyasins following Swami's teachings and methods.

Swami Chinmayananda, Swami Abedananda, and many other saints ascribes to Swami the responsibility for their turning to spiritual life. Swami has also many grihastha disciples like Bodheswaran, Perunnelli Krishnan Vaidhyan, Velutheri Kesavan Vaidhyan, Kumbalath Sanku Pillai etc. as well as sanyasi disciples like Neelakanta Therthapada and Theerthapada Parmahamsa who played very important role in renaissance and reformation in Kerala.

Death

Swamikal settled down at Panmana, a village in Kollam district, towards the end of his life. He died on 5 May 1924 after a short illness during which he objected to taking any medicine He was buried at Panmana.

Major works

Swamikal's writings comprise various forms, such as single stanzas, muktakas, bhajan songs, essays, critical works, translations, commentaries, short notes, and letters. Swamikal led a wandering life and left what he wrote with those who were with him at the time of writing. Most of the works were only partially recovered and published. There were no later attempts to collect and conserve them, which led to the gradual loss of many of them. A few works were discovered and published eight decades after his death and inspired serious discussion, such as Adhibhasha and Pracheena Malayalam Part -II. The Centre for South Indian Studies has formed the Chattampi Swami Digital Archive (CSDA) project as an attempt to collect and collate extant documents related to Swamikal. Important works available in print are:

 Advaita Chinta Paddhati
 Vedantasangraham
 Vedanta Saram
 Vedadikara Nirupanam
 Christhumatha Saram
 Christhumatha Nirupanam
 Adi Bhasha
 Keralathile Desa Namangal
 Jivakarunya Nirupanam
 Devarcha Paddhatiyude Upodghatam
 Devi Manasa Puja Stotra Vyakhyanam
 Nijananda Vilasam
 Pranavavum Sankhya Darsanavum
 Moksha Pradipa Khandanam
 Prapanchathil Stri Purushanmarkkulla Sthanam
 Pracheena Malayalam
 Tamizhakam
 Dravida Mahatmyam
 Kerala Charithravum Tachudaya Kaimalum
 Bhasha Padma Puranam
 Malayalathile Chila Sthala Namangal
 Srichakra Pujakalpam 

The following works are not available, except through excerpts published in various journals and books by contemporaries.

 Advaita Panjaram
 Ozhuvilodukkam (Translation)
 Chidakasa Layam
 Tarka Rahasya Ratnam
 Parama Bhattara Darsanam
 Punarjanma Nirupanam
 Brahmatatva Nirbhasam
 Bhugola Sastram
 Shanmata Nirupanam
 Sarva Mata Samarasyam
 Stava Ratna Haravali

Vedadikara Nirupanam
Vedadikara Nirupanam is considered as one of his greatest works. It refuted the baseless customs and rules that existed in Kerala. For the first time in the region's history the work questioned the monopolisation of Vedas, sciences and education by a minority. While Nitya Chaitanya Yathi read it to his Master Nataraja Guru, the Master told that 'The words of the book are true like fire and it was to be considered our luck that these papers have not got burned'.

Works on Vedanta
Swami wrote many guides and commentaries on Vedanta for the common man. Notable among them is Advaita Chinthapaddhathi (1949), an introductory manual on practical Advaita. written in simple language to enable ordinary people without knowledge of Sanskrit to learn Vedanta. The book describes the trigunas, trimurthees, jivatmas, panchabutas, sukshma, sthula, sarirotpatti, dasagunas,prapancholpatti, Tatvamasi, and related Vedic concepts.

Works on Christianity
Christumatha Nirupanam contains two books – the Christumatha Saram (meaning Cream of Christianity) and Christumatha Nirupanam. The Christumatha Saram is his summary of what Christianity is, in accordance with the classical Indian Purva paksha tradition. In Christumatha Chedanam, he criticises various tenets of Christianity which goes against the teachings of Christ. Relying on the Bible itself he disapproves the arguments supporting conversion presented by the missionaries.

Research methods
Pracheena Malayalam also aimed at awakening the mind of the people of the region divided by various complexes to a collective sense of 'We'. Convictions of common origin and belief in a common ancestry were indispensable for the development of a collective mindset. Swami explored the roots of Kerala society and original inhabitants, and sociologically and genealogically connected most of the present groups in Kerala including the priestly class to common ancestors who were the original inhabitants known as the Nakas. B. Hrdaya Kumari says that Pracheena Malayalam is not only a good example of Swamikal's logical arguments but is the earliest example of application of hypothesis and fixed methodology for historical studies.

Women's rights
Swamikal also worked for the emancipation of women and encouraged them to come to the forefront of society. He stated that ancient religion and law in India gave equal status to women and that their role is very important in family and society. He stated that it was the misinterpretation of ancient texts resulting from male arrogance that degraded the position of women and their enslavement.

References

See Also (Social reformers of Kerala) 

 Sree Narayana Guru
 Dr. Palpu
 Arattpuzha Velayudha Panikkar

 Kumaranasan
 Rao Sahib Dr. Ayyathan Gopalan
 Brahmananda Swami Sivayogi
 Vaghbhatananda
 Mithavaadi Krishnan
 Moorkoth Kumaran

 Ayyankali
 Ayya Vaikundar
 Pandit Karuppan

Cited sources

Further reading

External links
Panmana Ashram
Parama Bhattara Vidyadhiraja Chattampi Swamikal
Chattampi Swami Archive

1853 births
1925 deaths
Indian Hindu spiritual teachers
Indian social reformers
Writers from Thiruvananthapuram
Advaitin philosophers
19th-century Hindu philosophers and theologians
20th-century Hindu philosophers and theologians
Vedanta
Malayali people
Malayali Hindu saints
Malayalam-language writers